Agop Dilâçar ( Hagop Martayan, Istanbul, 22 May 1895 – Istanbul, 12 September 1979) was a Turkish-Armenian linguist who specialized in Turkic languages. He was proficient in 12 languages, and in addition to Armenian and Turkish, Dilâçar knew English, French, Greek, Spanish, Azerbaijani, Latin, German, Russian and Bulgarian.

Biography 
Of Armenian descent, Agop Dilâçar was born Hagop Martayan in Constantinople in 1895. His father was Vahan Martayan and his mother Eugenie Martayan (née Sarafian). He studied English in the local American School editing the school's publication "School News" (1907). In 1910, Dilâçar studied at the Robert College where he also learned German, Latin and Classical Greek, graduating from Robert College in 1915. After completing his studies, he served as an officer in the Ottoman Army's Second Division in Diyarbakır. Dilâçar was awarded for his bravery and continued serving in the Ottoman Army reserves. Because of his knowledge of English, he worked as a Turkish Army interpreter for the British prisoners of war held after the Siege of Kut south of Baghdad. Dilâçar was arrested and escorted to Damascus for alleged secret extrajudicial contacts with the British prisoners. In Damascus, he was introduced for the first time to Mustafa Kemal Pasha (later known as Atatürk). Mustafa Kemal Pasha was then the Commander of the Ottoman Army's Seventh Division. Mustafa Kemal was impressed by Dilâçar's intelligence and secured a pardon for him and took him into his headquarters.

In 1918, Dilâçar moved to Lebanon, where he became the headmaster of Beirut's Sourp Nshan Armenian National School. In Lebanon, he established Louys, an Armenian periodical (in Armenian Լոյս, meaning The Light). In 1919, he returned to Istanbul where he worked as a lecturer of English at the Robert College. In 1922, he married Méliné Martayan and the couple moved to Bulgaria where he taught Ottoman Turkish and ancient East languages at Sofia University in Sofia, Bulgaria. In Sofia he also published the Armenian weekly Mshagouyt (in Armenian Մշակոյթ, meaning Culture) and the monthly Armenian periodical Rahvira (in Armenian Ռահվիրայ).

Dilâçar published a study of Turkish language in Istanbul's Arevelk (in Armenian Արեւելք, meaning The East). A translated copy of the article gained the attention of Mustafa Kemal Pasha who invited him to return to Turkey where he lectured in Faculty of Languages, History and Geography.

On 22 September 1932, Dilâçar was invited as a linguist to the First Turkish Language Congress held in Dolmabahçe Palace supervised by Atatürk, the founder and first president of the Republic of Turkey and in that congress he presented his paper titled "Relations Between Turkish, Sumerian and Indo-European Languages". He continued his work and research on the Turkish language as a member of the linguistic-philology and etymology commissions of the newly founded Turkish Language Association in Ankara. Following the issue of the Law on Family Names in 1934, Mustafa Kemal Pasha suggested him the surname Dilaçar (literally meaning language opener), which he gladly accepted. Nevertheless, he continued to use the surname Martayan to sign his articles in the Armenian language. In return, Agop Martayan openly proposed the name Atatürk to Mustafa Kemal Pasha in the Grand National Assembly of Turkey. He presented the paper "Turkish Paleo Etymology" at the 2nd Turkish Language Congress held on 18 - 23 August 1934.

Dilâçar taught history and language at Ankara University between 1936 and 1951. He became one of the head specialists of the Turkish Language Association with the 4th Turkish Language Congress. He also was the head adviser of the Türk Ansiklopedisi (Turkish Encyclopedia), between 1942 and 1960. He held his position and continued his research in linguistics at the Turkish Language Association until his death on 12 September 1979, in Istanbul.

Armenian publications 
In addition to his work in Turkish language, Dilâçar also published in Istanbul's Armenian media, in particular with the Armenian daily Marmara (in Armenian Մարմարա).

In 1922, Dilâçar published his literary work Aratchin Portsutyun (in Armenian «Առաջին Փորձութիւն» meaning First Try). Also in 1922, he translated Armenian playwright Levon Shant's play Hin Asdvadzner (in Armenian «Հին աստվածներ» meaning Old Gods) to English. In 1929 he published his Armenological study "Kri Dzakoume yev Daradzoume" (in Armenian «Գրի ծագումը և տարածումը» meaning the origin and spread of language) and in 1929 "Hapetapanoutyun" (in Armenian «Հաբեթաբանութիւն») in addition to an Armenian translation of a collection of English poetry under the title Albyoni Bardezen (in Armenian «Ալբիոնի պարտէզէն» meaning from the garden of Albion) also in 1929.

In 1951, Dilâçar published his book Hazar Hink Harur Amyagi Khoher («1500ամեակի խոհեր» - meaning Thoughts on the 1500th Anniversary). In 1956 he published his book Asdvadzashountche yev Ashkharhapare (in Armenian «Աստուածաշունչը եւ Աշխարհաբարը» meaning The Holy  Bible and Modern Armenian language).

Dilâçar had numerous written works in linguistics, literature, studies and translations in Armenian. For example his literary work Salin Vra (Kragan Portser) (in Armenian Սալին Վրայ (գրական փորձեր), a collection of poems Khonchadz Yerazner (in Armenian «Խոնջած Երազներ»), a theatrical piece Tsaykatiter (in Armenian «Ցայգաթիթեռ») and studies like "Levon Shant, Ir Pilisopayoutyune yev Kegharvesde" (in Armenian Լեւոն Շանթ՝ Իր Փիլիսոփայութիւնը եւ Գեղարուեստը, meaning Levon Shant, his philosophy and artistry) and "Hay Tyutsaznavebe, Pakhtadadagan Himi Vera" (in Armenian Հայ Դիւցազնավէպը Բաղդատատական Հիմի Վրայ meaning The Armenian heroic epic novel on a comparative basis).

Armenian descent 
After his death in 1979, in a news coverage, the then only Turkish TV channel TRT concealed the first name "Agop", which would suggest an Armenian descent, and instead mentioned "A. Dilaçar", using only the initial of his forename together with his surname. However, in a TV program in TRT, which Dilaçar joined, his first name was pronounced and spelled as well, crediting him "Agop Dilaçar".

Controversy 
It is an issue of controversy whether Dilâçar was the person who officially proposed the surname Atatürk to the founder of Turkey, Mustafa Kemal Pasha, or Saffet Arıkan's "Ulu Önderimiz Ata Türk Mustafa Kemal" (Our Great Leader Ata Türk Mustafa Kemal) sentence in the opening speech of the 2nd Language Day on 26 September 1934 became an inspiration for surname Atatürk. Contemporary newspapers and other articles favor the latter claim.

Publications 
in Turkish
 Azeri Türkçesi (Azerbaijani Turkish), 1950
 Batı Türkçesi (Western Turkish), 1953
 Lehçelerin Yazılma Tarzı (Writing Style of Dialects)
 Türk Dil ve Lehçelerinin Tasnifi Meselesi (Classification Issue of the Turkish Languages and Dialects), 1954
 Devlet Dili Olarak Türkçe (Turkish as a State Language), 1962
 Wilhelm Thomsen ve Orhon Yazıtlarının Çözülüşü (Wilhelm Thomson and Encoding of the Orkhon Inscriptions), 1963
 Türk Diline Genel Bir Bakış (A General Look at the Turkish Language), 1964
 Türkiye'de Dil Özleşmesi (Language Purification in Turkey), 1965
 Dil, Diller ve Dilcilik (Language, Languages and Linguistics), 1968
 Kutadgu Bilig İncelemesi (Research of the Kutadgu Bilig), 1972
 Anadili İlkeleri ve Türkiye Dışındaki Uygulamalar (Native Language Principles and Applications Outside Turkey), 1978

in French
 Les bases bio-psychologiques de la Theorie Güneş Dil (1936)

in Armenian
 1500ամեակի խոհեր (Hazar Hink Harur Amyagi Khoher, Thoughts on the 1500th Anniversary), 1951
 Աստուածաշունչը եւ աշխարհաբարը (Asdvadzashountche yev Ashkharhapare, The Bible and the Armenian Modern Language), 1956
 Յօդուածներ (Hotvadzner, Articles), 2000
 Համայնապատկեր հայ մշակոյթի (Hamaynabadger Hay Meshagouyti Panorama of the Armenian Culture), vol. I, 2004
 Համայնապատկեր հայ մշակոյթի (Hamaynabadger Hay Meshagouyti Panorama of the Armenian Culture), vol. II, 2005

See also 
 Turkish language
 Turkish Language Association
 Atatürk's Reforms
 Sun Language Theory
 Karamanoğlu Mehmet Bey

References

External links 
Dilaçar's biography 

1895 births
1979 deaths
Writers from Istanbul
Robert College alumni
Linguists from Turkey
Academic staff of Ankara University
Turkish people of Armenian descent
Linguists of Turkic languages
Schoolteachers from Istanbul
Burials at Şişli Armenian Cemetery
20th-century linguists